Bayuquan railway station is a railway station in Bayuquan District, Yingkou, Liaoning province, China. It opened along with the Harbin–Dalian high-speed railway on 1 December 2012.

See also
Chinese Eastern Railway
South Manchuria Railway
South Manchuria Railway Zone

References

Railway stations in Liaoning
Railway stations in China opened in 2012